Margo Gunn (born 8 February 1956) is an English actress and a teacher of drama and theatre studies.

Born in Doncaster, West Riding of Yorkshire, England, Gunn attended Doncaster Grammar School for Girls where she was head girl. She appeared in Taggart "Cold Blood" in 1987 as Geraldine Keenan and again in "The Knife Trick" in 2009, as Pippa Harris, a friend of Robbie's and a senior lecturer in criminology. She also played the character Suzanne Harris in the 1993 episode "Instrument of Justice".

Between 2003 and 2005 she was director of Drama and head of Department at Gateways School near Leeds. She currently works teaching drama at Lewes Old Grammar School and as an educational practitioner for the Shakespeare Globe Theatre in London. She has worked as a LAMDA Drama teacher at the Dulwich College and Lancing Preparatory School. She has also taught at the Bristol Old Vic Theatre School, Bristol University Drama Department. She used to run her own drama workshops for children called Active Arts with Amanda Jordan, a home educator and former theatre director. She has also done work with the Drama Department at St Bede's Senior School in Hailsham. She recently started working at Lewes Old Grammar School as a drama coach. She has appeared in TV adverts for Lloyds Pharmacy Hayfever Reliever (2009) and Warner Hotels Break from Multitasking (2010).

Filmography
2011 - New Tricks: "End of the Line" (TV)
2007 - Dalziel and Pascoe: "Demons on Our Shoulders" (TV)
2001 - Murder Rooms: "The White Knight Stratagem" (TV)
1998 - The Adventures of Swiss Family Robinson (TV)
1997 - Coronation Street (TV)
1995 - Heartbeat (TV) 
1994 - Wycliffe (TV)
1993 - Doctor Finlay (TV)
1991 - Den ofrivillige golfaren AKA "The Accidental Golfer"
1991 - The Bill (TV) Sally Joseph - 'A woman scorned'
1991 - The Miser (Theatre) 
1984 - Look and Read: Badger Girl (TV)

External links

1956 births
Living people
Actresses from Yorkshire
Actors from Doncaster
English television actresses